The 1907 South Longford by-election was held on 6 September 1907.  The by-election was held due to the resignation of the incumbent Irish Parliamentary MP, Edward Blake, following a stroke.  It was won by the Irish Parliamentary candidate John Phillips, who was unopposed.

References

By-elections to the Parliament of the United Kingdom in County Longford constituencies
1907 elections in the United Kingdom
Unopposed by-elections to the Parliament of the United Kingdom (need citation)
1907 elections in Ireland